FC Oktan Perm was a Russian football club from Perm, founded in 1958. It played its first professional season in the Russian Second Division in 2011. After the 2013-14 season, it was dissolved.
 
In 2006-2010 it played in Amateur Football League, zone Ural and West Siberia, finished there 2nd in 2009, 2010, and 3rd in 2007. The team won the Ural and West Siberia Cup in 2006, 2009, 2010, and was its runner-up in 2008. It twice participated in the Russian Cup being an amateur club.

Team name history
 1958–1990: FC Neftyanik Perm
 1990–1995: FC Neftekhimik Perm
 1996–2014: FC Oktan Perm

External links
 Official site
Team history by KLISF

Association football clubs established in 1958
Defunct football clubs in Russia
Sport in Perm, Russia
1958 establishments in Russia
Association football clubs disestablished in 2014